In Homer's Odyssey, Argos is Odysseus' faithful dog.

Background
After ten years of fighting in Troy, followed by ten more years struggling to get home to Ithaca, Odysseus finally arrives at his homeland.  In his absence, reckless suitors have taken over his house in hopes of marrying his wife Penelope. In order to secretly re-enter his house to ultimately spring a surprise attack on the suitors, Odysseus disguises himself as a beggar, and only his son Telemachus is told of his true identity.  As Odysseus approaches his home, he finds Argos lying neglected on a pile of cow manure, infested with fleas, old and very tired.  

This is a sharp contrast to the dog Odysseus left behind; Argos used to be known for his speed and strength and his superior tracking skills. Unlike everyone else, including Eumaios, a lifelong friend, Argos recognizes Odysseus at once and he has just enough strength to drop his ears and wag his tail but cannot get up to greet his master. Unable to greet his beloved dog, as this would betray who he really was, Odysseus passes by (but not without shedding a tear) and enters his hall, and Argos dies. The simplicity of the relationship between Argos and Odysseus allows their reunion to be immediate and sincere. This was a substantial event in the marking of Odysseus's return.

Excerpt from the Odyssey
As they were speaking, a dog that had been lying asleep raised his head and pricked up his ears. This was Argos, whom Odysseus had bred before setting out for Troy, but he had never had any enjoyment from him. In the old days he used to be taken out by the young men when they went hunting wild goats, or deer, or hares, but now that his master was gone he was lying neglected on the heaps of mule and cow dung that lay in front of the stable doors till the men should come and draw it away to manure the great close; and he was full of fleas. As soon as he saw Odysseus standing there, he dropped his ears and wagged his tail, but he could not get close up to his master. When Odysseus saw the dog on the other side of the yard, dashed a tear from his eyes without Eumaios seeing it, and said:

'Eumaeus, what a noble dog that is over yonder on the manure heap: his build is splendid; is he as fine a fellow as he looks, or is he only one of those dogs that come begging about a table, and are kept merely for show?'

'This dog,' answered Eumaios, 'belonged to him who has died in a far country. If he were what he was when Odysseus left for Troy, he would soon show you what he could do. There was not a wild beast in the forest that could get away from him when he was once on its tracks. But now he has fallen on evil times, for his master is dead and gone, and the women take no care of him. Servants never do their work when their master's hand is no longer over them, for Zeus takes half the goodness out of a man when he makes a slave of him.'

 So saying he entered the well-built mansion and made straight for the riotous pretenders in the hall.  But Argos passed into the darkness of death, now that he had fulfilled his destiny of faith and seen his master once more after twenty years.

—Homer, Odyssey, Book 17, lines 290-327

See also
Man's best friend (phrase)
Greek mythology in popular culture
Hachikō — a real-life dog who waited for his dead owner for years after his master had died
Greyfriars Bobby — another real-life dog who stayed by his master's grave for fourteen years
Shep (American dog) — a real-life dog whose master's casket was taken away by train and met every train for six years until his death
Gelert — belonged to Llywelyn the Great, Prince of Gwynedd. Defended a baby from a wolf attack.
Jurassic Bark — an episode of Futurama with thematic elements similar to those of Odysseus and Argos, involving Fry and his dog waiting for him till his death

References

Characters in the Odyssey
Mythological dogs
Dogs in literature